Operation Winterzauber (Operation "Winter magic") was an anti-partisan operation from 15 February to 30 March 1943 aimed at creating a depopulated zone of 30 to 40 km along the Belarusian–Latvian border. It was mainly conducted by the Latvian collaborators under German command in the period in the triangle of Sebezh–Osveya–Polotsk in Northern Belarus (Drissa, Osveya, Polotsk, Rasony districts) and in Sebezhsky District of Pskov region in Russia; in the USSR it became known as "the Osveya tragedy." According to the Foreign Ministry of the Russian Federation, justice of Germany qualified operation "Winter magic" as a crime against humanity.

Objectives 
The operation was to establish a buffer zone devoid of people and settlements to a width of 40 km between Drissa in the South Zilupe and Smolnya in the North, covering the area of Asveya — Drysa — Polotsk — Sebezh — Rasony (Belarus, Russia). This depopulated area was to deprive the partisans of their strong points and resources.

The operation and death toll 
The executions were carried out in the villagers' own homes, with the bodies covered in straw and the houses set on fire.  Evidence from Russian sources indicates that many were deliberately burned alive.  The rest, mostly women and children, were sent on foot to the place of the so-called "second sluicing"; those who were exhausted on the way were shot.  Modular camps people were sent to other camps, including Salaspils concentration camp near Riga, where women were separated from their children and sent to work in Germany or in Latvia.

From 16–18 February 1943, the Nazis destroyed the village of Rositsa.  Younger and stronger people were sent to the station of Bigosovo, where they were loaded into wagons and taken to the concentration camp of Salaspils and work in Latvia and Germany.  The remaining people were burned in houses, a large group of people was driven into a barn that was then set on fire.  Among those killed were Roman Catholic priests Jury Kashyra and Antoni Leszczewicz:  one was burned with other residents, the other was shot for persistent requests to save the children (according to other sources also burned).  In 1999, Pope John Paul II declared the murdered priests blessed.

Several hundred villages were destroyed.  In one Osveya area, 183 villages were burned down, 11,383 people were killed, and over 7500 residents were deported — adults to work in Germany, children in the Salaspils concentration camp.  Partisans in Novgorod region, Belarusian partisans, Soviet partisans in Latvia, and the populace themselves had resisted the invaders desperately.  The most famous episode was the fight of ninety Soviet Latvian partisans against four Latvian punitive battalions supported by tanks and aircraft, on the hill Apsu Kalny.  To rescue civilians, the command of the Soviet 6th air army carried out an air operation, during which eight to eleven thousand people were evacuated to Soviet territory.

Surviving witness Valentin Martsinkevich, who was ten years old at the time of the atrocity, recalled:
We gathered and were led along the road.  Crossed the river, and there on the tanks, the SS and the dogs.  They drove us to the village Kulakovo.  Women with children were placed in the local school, men inside the barn.  Then the interpreter tells us and two other families who were sitting nearby to leave.  At the porch there was a sled.  We sat down in it, rode thirty meters, and we saw that the school was on fire.  It was first doused with gasoline and then fired on with incendiary bullets.  The barn with the men was also set on fire.  Those trying to get out through the windows or the roof were shot.  Women began to scream, and the policeman took the whip and began to hit hard and scream:  "Be quiet, or I'll shoot!"
She recalled that they were transported by train to Salaspils concentration camp.  No food or water was given them during the transport, and small children died on the way.  At a stop in Daugavpils, they asked passers-by to throw the snow through the window into the train coach.

According to controversial Russian historian Alexander Dyukov, during this operation 221 partisans and about 3900 local inhabitants were killed, over 7000 were deported for forced labor or imprisoned to Salaspils concentration camp, 439 villages were burnt down or 70 partisans and about 10-12 thousands of local inhabitants were killed, including women and children and a "dead zone" to a width of 15 km was established.

Commemorations 
In Belarus, events take place dedicated to the memory of the victims.  In February 2008, in the Verkhnedvinsk district house of culture held a literary-musical composition "St. Aswe Complaints" with poems by Belarusian poets and memories shared by witnesses.  In the village Osveya near the mound of Immortality a meeting of war veterans, youth, and the public was held, which was addressed by politicians, priest, and former young prisoners of Salaspils.  Events take place in other localities.

Punitive formations 
The operation was supervised by the Higher SS and Police Leader of the Baltic region SS-Obergruppenführer Friedrich Jeckeln.  

The operation was mainly held by Latvian Police Battalions:

 271st Aizpute Latvian Police Battalion;
 273rd Ludza Latvian Police Battalion;
 276th Kuldiga Latvian Police Battalion;
 277th Sigulda Latvian Police Battalion;
 278th Dobele Latvian Police Battalion;
 280th Bolderaya Latvian Police Battalion;
 281st Abrene Latvian Police Battalion.

The operation initially also involved:

 The 50th Ukrainian police battalion
 SS police company
 German anti-aircraft part
 German artillery battery of the division
 two German communications platoons
 2nd air group of special purpose.

O. Original German units and Ukrainian police battalion were not included in the composition of combat groups, serving as reserve command.

During the operation, new formation were added:

 Hastily formed 282nd Latvian "security" battalion
 The 2nd Lithuanian police battalion
 Rota 36th Estonian police battalion
 Einsatzkommando of the security police under the command of SS obersturmfuhrer Krause
 Einsatzkommando DM under the command of SS hauptsturmfuhrer Kaufman

The total number of Einsatzkommando of the security police and the SD were 210 people. The total strength of the forces involved in the operation was about 4000 people.

The following units were later added: the Ukrainian and Lithuanian police battalions of the German police company of the SS, the German motorized gendarmerie platoon and attached to Einsatzkommando of the security police and the SD.

For example, the battle group "Bertha" included:

3rd tank army;
 The 201st security division
 281st security division
 391st training field division.

Citations

References
 Wolfgang Curilla: Die deutsche Ordnungspolizei und der Holocaust im Baltikum und in Weißrußland 1941-1944. 2. Auflage. Ferdinand-Schöningh-Verlag, Paderborn 2006.
 
 А. Р. Дюков: Операция «Зимнее волшебство» Нацистская истребительная политика и латвийский коллаборационизм. Фонд «Историческая память», Moskau 2011. [English: Operation Winterzauber: Nazi policy of extermination and Latvian collaborationism]
 H. Судленкова: «Зимнее волшебство» СС. // Сайт журнала «Россия в глобальной политике». (www.globalaffairs.cz) (28. Juni 2007). 
 K. Kangeris: Latviešu policijas bataljoni lielajās partizānu apkarošanas akcijās 1942. un 1943. gadā // Totalitārie okupācijas režīmi Latvijā 1940−1964. Latvijas vēstures institūta apgāds, Riga 2004, . (Latvijas Vēsturnieku komisijas raksti)
 А. Р. Дюков: «Зимнее волшебство»: нацистская карательная операция в белорусско-латвийском приграничье, февраль — март 1943 г. Документы и материалы. [English: Winterzauber: Nazi punitive operation on the Belarus-Latvia border region, February – March 1943. Documents and records.] Фонд «Исторически память», 2013. 

Winterzauber
Winterzauber
Latvian collaborators with Nazi Germany